Gernot Faderbauer (born 23 April 1969) is an Austrian lightweight rower. He won a gold medal at the 1993 World Rowing Championships in Račice with the lightweight men's quadruple scull.

References

1969 births
Living people
Austrian male rowers
World Rowing Championships medalists for Austria
Olympic rowers of Austria
Rowers at the 1996 Summer Olympics